Thomas "Ted" Ranken (18 May 1875 – 27 April 1950), was a British sport shooter, who competed at the 1908 Summer Olympics and 1924 Summer Olympics.

In the 1908 Olympics he won silver medals in the single-shot running deer event, in the double-shot running deer event and in the team single-shot running deer event. He was also fifth in the 1000 yard free rifle event.

References

External links
profile

1875 births
1950 deaths
British male sport shooters
Olympic shooters of Great Britain
Shooters at the 1908 Summer Olympics
Shooters at the 1924 Summer Olympics
Olympic silver medallists for Great Britain
Olympic medalists in shooting
Medalists at the 1908 Summer Olympics
20th-century British people